Ehren is a given name. Notable people with the name include:

Ehren Earleywine, American sports coach and administrator
Ehren Kruger (born 1972), American film producer and screenwriter
Ehren McGhehey (born 1976), American stunt performer and actor
Ehren Painter (born 1998), English rugby union player
Ehren Wassermann (born 1980), American baseball player and coach
Ehren Watada (born 1978), American army officer
Kyle Ehren Snyder (born 1977), American baseball player and coach

German masculine given names